The Elizabeth line is a high-frequency hybrid urban–suburban rail service in London and its suburbs. The service is named after Queen Elizabeth II, who officially opened the line on 17 May 2022 during her Platinum Jubilee year; passenger services started on 24 May 2022.

Under the project name of Crossrail, the system was approved in 2007, and construction began in 2009. Originally planned to open in 2018, the project was repeatedly delayed, including for several months as a result of the COVID-19 pandemic.

These services were augmented by a new central section in May 2022, and rebranded as the Elizabeth line. The outer services were connected to the central section in November 2022. By May 2023, the central section will have up to 24 nine-carriage Class 345 trains per hour in each direction.

History 

In 2001, Cross London Rail Links (CLRL), a 50/50 joint-venture between Transport for London (TfL) and the Department for Transport (DfT), was formed to develop and promote the Crossrail scheme, and also a Wimbledon–Hackney scheme, Crossrail 2. In 2003 and 2004, over 50days of exhibitions were held to explain the proposals at over 30 different locations.

2005 route development 
In 2005, ahead of Crossrail's hybrid bill submission, a number of feeder routes were considered by CLRL west of Paddington and east of Liverpool Street. It was viewed, given the 24trains-per-hour (tph) core frequency, that two feeder routes, each of 12tph, could be taken forward.

In the west, a route to Maidenhead (later extended to Reading) and Heathrow Airport was selected. In the east, routes to Abbey Wood (curtailed from Ebbsfleet to avoid conflicts with the North Kent lines) and Shenfield were selected.

Approval 
The Crossrail Act 2008 authorising the construction project received royal assent on 22 July 2008. In December 2008, TfL and the DfT announced that they had signed the "Crossrail Sponsors' Agreement". This committed them to financing the project, then projected to cost £15.9billion, with further contributions from Network Rail, BAA, and the City of London.

Construction 

Work began on 15 May 2009, when piling works started at the future Canary Wharf station.

Boring of the railway tunnels was officially completed in June 2015. Installation of the track was completed in September 2017. The European Train Control System (ETCS) signalling was scheduled to be tested in the Heathrow tunnels over the winter of 2017–2018.

At the end of August 2018, four months before the scheduled opening of the core section of the line, it was announced that completion was delayed and that the line would not open before autumn 2019. After multiple delays, in August 2020 Crossrail announced that the central section would be ready to open "in the first half of 2022".

In May 2021, trial running commenced.

On 17 May 2022, the line was officially opened by Queen Elizabeth II in honour of her Platinum Jubilee. She was not scheduled to attend the event, but decided to attend with her son, Prince Edward, to unveil the plaque commemorating the official opening.

Timeline 
Though the main tunnels under central London had not yet been opened, passenger operations on the outer branches of the future Elizabeth line were transferred to TfL for inclusion in the concession – this took place over several stages beginning May 2015. During this initial phase of operation, services were operated by MTR under the TfL Rail brand. Following the practice adopted during the transfer of former Silverlink services to London Overground in 2007, TfL carried out a deep clean of stations and trains on the future Elizabeth line route, installed new ticket machines and barriers, introduced Oyster card and contactless payment, and ensured all stations were staffed. Existing rolling stock was rebranded with the TfL Rail identity.

Route 

The Elizabeth line runs on an east–west axis across the London region, with branches terminating at Abbey Wood and Shenfield in the east, and at Heathrow Terminal 4, Heathrow Terminal 5 and Reading in the west. There are 41 stations. In the central section, there are interchanges with London Underground, National Rail and Docklands Light Railway lines.

Design and infrastructure

Name and identity 
Crossrail is the name of the construction project and of the limited company, wholly owned by TfL, that was formed to carry out construction works.

The Elizabeth line is the name of the new service that is on signage throughout the stations. It is named in honour of Queen Elizabeth II. The Elizabeth line roundel is coloured purple, with a superimposed blue bearing white text in the same style as for Underground lines. However, unlike Underground lines, the Elizabeth line roundel includes the word "line".

TfL Rail was an intermediate brand name which was introduced in May 2015 and discontinued in May 2022. It was used by TfL on services between Paddington and Heathrow Terminal 5 and Reading, as well as trains between Liverpool Street and Shenfield.

Stations 

Ten new stations have been built in the central and south east sections of the line, and 31 existing stations were upgraded and refurbished. Nine of the ten new-build stations opened for revenue service on 24 May 2022; the remaining stationBond Streetrequired additional finishing works before commissioning could proceed. Trains passed through its platforms non-stop until it opened five months later on 24 October. All stations are equipped with CCTV and because of the length of trains, central stations have train indicators above the platform-edge doors. All 41 stations are step-free, with 13 of these (the central and Heathrow stations) having level access between trains and platforms.

In the eastern section,  and  have not had platform extensions, so trains use selective door opening instead. At Maryland this is because of the prohibitive cost of extensions and the poor business case, and at Manor Park it is due to the presence of a freight loop that would otherwise be cut off.

A mock-up of the new stations was built in Bedfordshire in 2011 to ensure that their architectural integrity would last for a century. It was planned to bring at least one mock-up to London for the public to view the design and give feedback before final construction commenced.

Future stations

Rolling stock 

Services on the Elizabeth line are operated exclusively by a fleet of nine-car Class 345 trains that was procured especially for this purpose. In March 2011, Crossrail indicated that five bidders had been shortlisted as potential suppliers of both the new fleet and its depot facilities; Alstom, CAF, Siemens Mobility, Hitachi Rail, and Bombardier Transportationalthough Alstom withdrew four months later. Crossrail issued invitations to negotiate to the remaining bidders in March 2012, with submission of tenders expected between June and August. It was stipulated that bidders should offer a fleet based on technology that was "already developed", with the expectation that an "evolutionary, not revolutionary" product would help to ensure "value for money" and "[the] utmost reliability from day one". Siemens withdrew their rolling stock bid in July 2013, citing an increase in other business and a need to protect their "ability to deliver ... current customer commitments", which included the £1.6 billion  order for Thameslink. Their contract to supply Crossrail's signalling and control systems was unaffected.
 
In December 2013, the European Investment Bank (EIB) agreed to provide TfL loans of up to £500 million to fund the rolling stock procurement, following TfL's decision in March of that year to abandon plans to cover most of the cost with private financing.

TfL and the Department for Transport announced in early February 2014 that Bombardier's bid had been successful. The 32-year contract for the supply and maintenance of the trains and depot was valued at £1 billion. It included a firm order for 65 units from Bombardier's new Aventra family, plus an option for a further 18. The trains have air-conditioning and are designed to be as accessible as possible, including wide aisles and gangways, dedicated areas for wheelchairs, audio and visual announcements, CCTV, and passenger intercoms connected to the driver for use in the event of emergency.

Due to limited platform lengths at both Liverpool Street and Paddington National Rail stations, most Class 345 units were initially delivered as seven-car formations, then later extended to the intended nine. The first unit entered service on 22 June 2017, between Liverpool Street and Shenfield. TfL exercised an option to acquire a further five units in July 2017, bringing the total number on order to 70.

A number of  units that had been operating with TfL Rail remained in use on Elizabeth line services between Liverpool Street's terminal platforms and Shenfield alongside Class 345 units while the introduction of the new fleetincluding the extension to nine-car formationswas completed. The Class 315 units, which had been built for British Rail in 1980–1981, could not be used in the line's core section. The final four were withdrawn from service on 9 December 2022.

Electrification and train protection 
The Elizabeth line uses 25kV, 50Hz AC overhead lines, already in use on the Great Eastern and Great Western Main Lines.

The Heathrow branch started using the European Train Control System (ETCS) in 2020. The Automatic Warning (AWS) and Train Protection & Warning (TPWS) systems are used on the Great Western and Great Eastern Main Lines, with possible later upgrades to ETCS. Communications-based train control (CBTC) is installed in the central section and the Abbey Wood branch.

Depots 
The Elizabeth line has depots in west London at Old Oak Common TMD, in south-east London at Plumstead Depot, and in east London at Ilford EMU Depot.

Service pattern

Initial service
Upon opening, the line ran as three physically separate services: between Reading or Heathrow airport and London Paddington in the west; from Paddington via Liverpool Street to Abbey Wood in the centre; and between London Liverpool Street and Shenfield in the east. To connect between services, a walk between the separate stations at Paddington or Liverpool Street was required.

Current service
As of 6 November 2022, when through-running began, there are two main service groups, overlapping through the core section: from Reading or Heathrow Airport to Abbey Wood; and from Paddington to Shenfield. The off-peak weekday service is as follows:

Some early morning and late night services run into London Paddington main line terminus instead of going across central London. Likewise, some early, peak-direction, and late trains run between London Liverpool Street main line terminus and Gidea Park, bypassing Whitechapel.

Planned service
In May 2023, it is planned to allow trains to run from both eastern branches to west of Paddington. This will allow both more flexible, and higher frequency, services: 24tph peak, 20tph off-peak, and direct services between Shenfield and Heathrow. In the longer term, when  opens, all trains will serve Old Oak Common, with those not serving the Reading or Heathrow branches reversing there.

The service changes for 21 May 2023 were confirmed in February 2023. The peak timetable will increase to 24 trains per hour. Off-peak service level will remain at 16 trains per hour, with two Shenfield–Paddington trains extended to Heathrow Airport Terminal 5 and two Abbey Wood–Terminal 5 trains switching to Terminal 4.

Journey times

Ticketing 
Ticketing is integrated with the other London transport systems, but Oyster pay as you go is not accepted on the western section between West Drayton (the limit of London fare zone 6) and Reading, with only contactless cards valid there. The concessionary travel Freedom Pass is valid for the whole length of the route, including stations outside London. The Elizabeth line is integrated with the London Underground, the wider Transport for London network and the National Rail networks; it is also included on the standard Tube map.

Journeys to or from Heathrow Airport are priced at a premium due to using the rail tunnel between the airport and Hayes & Harlington. That stretch of line is not part of the Network Rail system but owned by Heathrow Airport Holdings, who charge TfL an additional fee for each train that uses it. Heathrow is nevertheless included within the Travelcard scheme and daily/weekly fare capping as a fare zone 6 station.

Passenger numbers 
Before the COVID-19 pandemic, the Elizabeth line was predicted to carry over 200 million passengers annually immediately after opening; this was expected to relieve pressure on London Underground's lines, especially the Central line.  is expected to become one of the busiest stations in the UK, due to it being the key interchange station with Thameslink services. In a business plan for the line published in January 2020, Transport for London predicted total annual revenues from the line of nearly £500million per year in 2022/23 (its first full year of operation) and over £1billion per year in 2024/25. By the time the line opened, TfL had reduced their passenger forecasts because passenger travelling habits changed during the pandemic; the estimate was between 130 and 170 million passengers by 2026. However, the Elizabeth line carried 62.2 million passengers in the last quarter of 2022 alone. That was one-sixth of the UK's total rail journeys, and double the amount the line carried during the same period one year earlier.

Further proposals

New stations have been proposed to serve London City Airport, and extensions have been put forward to Ebbsfleet in the south east, Milton Keynes in the north west, Staines in the south west, and Southend Airport in the east.

See also 

 Crossrail 2 – second proposed Crossrail route providing a new north–south rail link across Greater London
 The Fifteen Billion Pound Railway, a documentary about the Elizabeth line's construction and commissioning
 Transport in London

References

Bibliography 

 
 
 
 
 
 
 
 
 
 
 

|-

|-

 
Transport at Heathrow Airport
London Rail
Regional rail in the United Kingdom
Railway operators in London
Underground commuter rail
Railway services introduced in 2022
2022 establishments in England
Monuments and memorials to Queen Elizabeth II